The 1912 Tennessee Volunteers football team represented the University of Tennessee in the 1912 college football season. 1912 squad was the first non-losing Volunteer team in four years, but they did not win a conference game. Zora G. Clevenger served his second season as head coach of the Volunteers.

Schedule

References

Tennessee
Tennessee Volunteers football seasons
Tennessee Volunteers football